This list of ship launches in 1946 includes a list of ships launched in 1946.



References 

Sources

1946
Ship launches